Album – Generic Flipper is the debut studio album by the noise rock band Flipper. It was released in June 1982 by Subterranean Records. It is also referred to as Album, Album: Generic, Generic Flipper and just Generic. It was issued on CD for the first time by American Recordings (formerly Def American) in 1992 and later deleted. In 2008, the rights reverted to Flipper, and the album was reissued on December 9, 2008, by Water Records. Former Nirvana bassist Krist Novoselic, who joined Flipper in 2006, contributed liner notes to the new reissue.

Reception

Robert Christgau praised the album, describing the music as "crude ("Everybody start at the same time, ready"), unremitting ("Sex Bomb" has seven words and lasts close to eight minutes), and immensely charitable and good-humored (Iggy with Jerry's soul, I'm not kidding)." He described the lyrics as "existential resignation at its most enthusiastic." "If great rock & roll is supposed to be about breaking the rules," wrote Mark Deming of AllMusic, "then Flipper's still-astonishing debut, Album -- Generic Flipper, confirms their status as one of the great rock bands of their day." He described the "brilliant" "Sex Bomb" as "the closest thing '80s punk ever created to the beer-fueled genius of the Kingsmen's "Louie Louie," and a song with a great beat that you just can't dance to." He also noted that despite their "sincere" misanthropy and cynicism, "on "Life" they dared to express a tres-unhip benevolence, declaring "Life is the only thing worth living for."" He concludes by writing that the band "plays noise rock with none of the pretension that later bands brought to the form, proving that music doesn't have to be fast to be punk (a lesson that gave the Melvins a reason to live), and creating a funny, harrowing, and surprisingly engaging masterwork that profoundly influenced dozens of later bands without sounding any less individual two decades later." Noel Gardner's review for NME described the band as one "who made a punishing virtue out of being sloppy, offbeat and imprecise. Flipper existed at the epicentre of the Californian punk scene in the early ’80s, but as their hardcore peers sped up, they slowed down. A simple concept that helped to create a remarkable, incomparable signature sound, one which trickled down into the musical visions of, most famously, Black Flag and Nirvana." He calls the album "their definitive statement [...] Lyrically a bipolar flip between ugly negativity and lightbulb-moment optimism (“Life is the only thing worth living for!”), musically, Generic turns almost unrelated layers of free expression into a blackened mass of enduring power."

Accolades

It was ranked 12th in The Village Voice'''s annual Pazz & Jop poll.

In November 2007, Blender magazine ranked it No. 86 on their list of the 100 greatest "indie rock" albums of all time. In 1995, Spin ranked it 79th on their list "100 Alternative Albums". In March 2004, Mojo included it on their list "Lost Albums You Must Own". Rolling Stone ranked it 26th on their list "40 Greatest Punk Albums of All Time" in 2016. In 2018, Pitchfork included it at no. 193 on "The 200 Best Albums of the 1980s".

Buzz Osborne of Melvins has said "This would be in my top five albums of all time." Donita Sparks of L7 listed it as one of her favorite grunge albums. Kurt Cobain listed it in his top 50 albums of all time.

Covers
Melvins covered "Way of the World", appearing on their collection Singles 1–12. Unto Ashes covered "Way of the World" on their 2005 album Grave Blessings''. R.E.M. covered "Sex Bomb" on their 1994 fan club Christmas single. L7 has covered the song by mashing it with "Sweet Leaf" by Black Sabbath, calling the resulting song "Sweet Sex."

Track listing

Personnel
Will Shatter – bass (1, 2, 5, 7, 8), lead vocals (3, 4, 6, 9), backup vocals (8)
Bruce Loose – bass (3, 4, 6, 9), lead vocals (1, 2, 5, 7, 8), backup vocals (6), special effects and bass feedback (7)
Ted Falconi – guitars
Steve DePace – drums, Synare (4, 9), tympani and extra percussion (7)
Flipper – hand clapping (1), percussion (7)

Additional personnel 
Bobby – saxophone (9)
Ward – saxophone (9)
Curtis – percussion (7)
Die Ant – percussion (7)
Johnnie – percussion (7)
"others" – percussion (7)

Production 
Chris: Producer
Flipper: Producer
Garry Creiman: Engineer

Charts

References

1982 debut albums
Flipper (band) albums
American Recordings (record label) albums
Subterranean Records albums
Domino Recording Company albums